The Groosalugg, nicknamed Groo, is a fictional character on the WB network's series Angel.  He appeared in seasons 2 and 3, and is portrayed by Mark Lutz.

History
The Groosalugg is a native of Pylea, a dimension where humans are treated as slaves and called cows.  He is a Pylean demon so deformed as to look human, but his only apparent non-human physical characteristic is a pair of dark-colored eyes. Because of his human heritage, he was banished to the "Scum Pits of Ur" where he was to die, but instead defeated every creature that attacked him.  This earned him a reputation for bravery and combat skill, and as such he wandered the countryside as an undefeated champion, or Groosalugg.  In Pylea there is a prophecy that the Groosalugg will one day com-shuck, or mate, with the entity that has "the curse," which in this case comes to mean Cordelia's visions.  After the two have mated, Cordelia's visions will be passed on to him.  Since Pylea is dominated by monks loyal to Wolfram & Hart, this would put the instrument of The Powers That Be under the control of evil.  Cordelia does not want this, at first because she believes the Groosalugg to be more demon-like, but this objection falls when Cordelia meets him and sees that he is, in fact, very handsome and nearly human.  However, Cordelia still does not want to consummate their relationship because she does not want to lose the visions.  Groo ends up proving that he is a good man, not a tool of evil, and helps Cordelia and the rest of the characters to escape Pylea.  At the end of season 2, Groo is installed as monarch of Pylea, the first to preside over the freedom of the human former slaves.

Midway through season 3, Angel and Cordelia are close to starting a relationship when Groo unexpectedly appears in Los Angeles.  He explains that he had been deposed in a revolution on Pylea, and decided to find Cordelia again.  The feelings that Cordelia has for Angel are immediately put on hold, and instead she chooses to rekindle her romance with Groo.  She even goes as far as to find a mystical spell which allows her both to have sex with Groo and to retain her visions.  Angel is jealous of Groo for many reasons, including that Cordelia has chosen Groo over him and that Groo is just as formidable a fighter as himself. For a time, Angel is concerned that Groo will replace him, due to him possessing equally dangerous combat skills while lacking most of Angel's weaknesses, but Wesley assures Angel that he remains their reason and drive for fighting the good fight in the first place. Despite a victory against a life-sucking tree demon that Groo could never have defeated himself proving his continued worth to the group, unable to withstand being witness to the relationship between Cordelia and Groo, Angel gives them money and asks that they go on an extended holiday.

When Cordelia and Groo return, they find that some terrible things have happened in their absence, such as Connor being stolen by Holtz and Wesley having betrayed the team in an attempt to protect Connor from a prophecy that seemed to foretell Angel killing his son. Cordelia immediately begins to pay more attention to Angel, and Groo starts to realize that Cordelia does not love him but rather Angel. In the last episode of season 3, Groo finally musters up the courage to tell Cordelia this, and he then leaves Los Angeles for parts unknown.

After the Fall
Angel: After the Fall is the canonical continuation of the Angel story, written by Brian Lynch with executive oversight from Joss Whedon. Its story begins immediately after Los Angeles is sent to hell in the Season Five Angel finale "Not Fade Away". The Groosalugg establishes himself in Silver Lake, a corner of the city that has been cleared of human-hostile demonic influence. He works with Lorne, who has become the freely elected leader of the area.  During Angel's visit to Lorne, Groo offers the ex-vampire his services whenever he needs them. He appears riding what appears to be a black pegasus. The beast's name is Cordelia, the same as Angel's dragon. Groo is one of the members of the Angel Investigations team rallied by Lorne to help Angel fight the Demon Lords, and he helps by breaking the chains on Angel's dragon. The Demon Lords are all destroyed.  In issue fifteen, Illyria decides to end all reality in order to end emotional pain and starts with demolishing what is left of Los Angeles. The Groosalugg is killed while attempting to stop her. He has enough time to bemoan the nature of this death. He is revived later as Angel forces the Senior Partners to rewind time to before Los Angeles was sent to hell. As with everyone who was involved with the After the Fall storyline, the Groosalugg retains all of his memories. The situation leaves Angel a publicly acclaimed hero. Angel leaves his dragon in the care of the Groosalugg as part of an attempt to regain anonymity. In later comics post-After the Fall, the Groosalugg assists Angel and Spike in saving a comic book convention threatened by various mystical dangers.

Lynch had wanted to use Lorne as part of the supporting cast of his Spike series. However, Lorne is off-limits since the death of likeness Andy Hallett and the character's send-off in Music of the Spheres. Consequently, Lynch chose Groo for the series, along with the Cordelia dragon and pegasus.

In the series, Groo and the dragon are called in by Spike to help clear a demonic infestation out of the city of Las Vegas.

Concept and creation
Andy Hallett, who played Lorne, called the Groosalugg "Fabio and Keanu Reeves' love child." Mark Lutz says, "He's got such a dichotomy to him where he's all brave and noble on one hand, and so naive and brainwashed on the other. I know a lot of the fans say, 'Oh, he's not the sharpest knife in the drawer,' but I think there's more to him than that."

Appearances

Canonical appearances
The Groosalugg has 16 canonical Angel appearances overall.

Angel
Season 2 (2000, 2001) - "Through the Looking Glass",  "There's No Place Like Plrtz Glrb"
Season 3 (2001, 2002) - "Waiting in the Wings", "Couplet", "Double or Nothing", "The Price", "A New World", "Benediction", "Tomorrow"
Angel: After the Fall
Angel: After the Fall #4, #5, #9, #10, #14, #15, #17
Boys and Their Toys pt.1 #26-27

Notes and references

Angel (1999 TV series) characters
Buffyverse demons
Television characters introduced in 2001
Fictional characters with superhuman strength
Fictional half-demons
Fictional characters from parallel universes
Fictional kings
Male characters in television